The 1976 St. Louis Cardinals season was the team's 95th season in St. Louis, Missouri and the 85th season in the National League. The Cardinals went 72–90 during the season and finished fifth in the National League East, 29 games behind the Philadelphia Phillies.

Offseason 
 October 28, 1975: Mike Garman and a player to be named later were traded by the Cardinals to the Chicago Cubs for Don Kessinger. The Cardinals sent completed the deal by sending Bobby Hrapmann (minors) to the Cubs on April 5, 1976.
 December 12, 1975: Buddy Bradford and Greg Terlecky were traded by the Cardinals to the Chicago White Sox for Lee Richard.
 December 22, 1975, Mick Kelleher was traded by the Cardinals to the Chicago Cubs for Vic Harris.
 January 7, 1976: John Butcher was drafted by the Cardinals in the 2nd round of the 1976 Major League Baseball Draft, but did not sign.
 February 3, 1976: Tom Walker was purchased by the Cardinals from the Detroit Tigers.
 March 2, 1976: Ted Sizemore was traded by the Cardinals to the Los Angeles Dodgers for Willie Crawford.

Regular season 
This was the twelfth and final season for Red Schoendienst as the Cardinals' full-time manager, although he would manage the club in parts of two later seasons (1980 and 1990).

The Cardinals went to the Columbia blue road uniforms for the first time in '76. They would continue to wear those uniforms through the 1984 season.

Season standings

Record vs. opponents

Notable transactions 
 April 9, 1976: Wayne Nordhagen was purchased from the Cardinals by the Philadelphia Phillies.
 May 19, 1976: Luis Meléndez was traded by the Cardinals to the San Diego Padres for Bill Greif.
 June 8, 1976: John Littlefield was drafted by the Cardinals in the 30th round of the 1976 Major League Baseball Draft.

Roster

Player stats

Batting

Starters by position 
Note: Pos = Position; G = Games played; AB = At bats; H = Hits; Avg. = Batting average; HR = Home runs; RBI = Runs batted in

Other batters 
Note: G = Games played; AB = At bats; H = Hits; Avg. = Batting average; HR = Home runs; RBI = Runs batted in

Pitching

Starting pitchers 
Note: G = Games pitched; IP = Innings pitched; W = Wins; L = Losses; ERA = Earned run average; SO = Strikeouts

Other pitchers 
Note: G = Games pitched; IP = Innings pitched; W = Wins; L = Losses; ERA = Earned run average; SO = Strikeouts

Relief pitchers 
Note: G = Games pitched; W = Wins; L = Losses; SV = Saves; ERA = Earned run average; SO = Strikeouts

Farm system 

LEAGUE CHAMPIONS: Johnson City

References

External links
1976 St. Louis Cardinals at Baseball Reference
1976 St. Louis Cardinals team page at www.baseball-almanac.com

St. Louis Cardinals seasons
Saint Louis Cardinals season
St Louis